Blanus tingitanus is a species of amphisbaenian in the family Blanidae.

Geographic range
B. tingitanus is found in northern Morocco including Ceuta (a Spanish autonomous city).

Taxonomy and systematics
B. tingitanus was formerly considered a part of Blanus cinereus, which (as currently defined) is restricted to Portugal and Spain.

Habitat
The natural habitats of B. tingitanus are temperate forests, Mediterranean-type shrubby vegetation, arable land, and pastureland.

Conservation stats
B. tingitanus is threatened by habitat loss.

References

tingitanus
Reptiles of North Africa
Endemic fauna of Morocco
Reptiles described in 1988
Taxa named by Stephen D. Busack
Taxonomy articles created by Polbot